Jaba Dvali (born 8 February 1985) is a Georgian former football player and current manager. 

He has played in three countries as a forward. He was a main goalscorer at Zestafoni during their "golden time" when the club twice in a row won the national league.

Career
Dvali started his professional career at Dinamo Tbilisi. After being loaned to three clubs, he moved to Moldovan side Dacia.

He spent three prolific seasons at Zestafoni during the height of their success in the early 2010s. Dvali personally played a vital role in the club. He became a top goalscorer of the league in 2011–12.  

In January 2014, Dvali agreed to join Azerbaijan Premier League side FK Qarabağ on a six-month loan deal. In June 2014, at the end of Dvali's loan deal with Qarabağ, he signed a 2-year contract with Zestafoni in Georgia. In December 2014, Dvali signed 2-year contract with Dacia Chișinău which came into force on 20 January 2015.

Between 2015 and 2019 Dvali played for five domestic clubs. Especially noteworthy during these short-term stints was his great contribution to Sioni's promotion to Erovnuli Liga, including in a play-off 3–2 victory over Dinamo Batumi where Dvali scored a hat-trick.

In March 2020, Dvali returned to football after a year-long pause as director general of Zestafoni. At one point in 2021, when this fourth-tier club was plagued with injuries and suspensions, he appeared in the starting line-up and even scored from the penalty spot.

Along with the management at the club, Dvali also took charge of Zestafoni Youth Academy.

Honours

Club 
 Dinamo Tbilisi
Georgian Premier League: 2004–05, 2012–13
Georgian Cup: 2003–04
Georgian Super Cup: Runner-up 2013–14
 Zestafoni
Georgian Premier League: 2010–11, 2011–12
Georgian Cup: 2012–13, Runner-up 2011–12
Georgian Super Cup: 2011–12
 Dacia Chișinău
Moldovan National Division Runner-up: 2007–08, 2008–09
Moldovan Cup Runner-up: 2008–09
 Qarabağ
Azerbaijan Premier League: 2013–14

Individual 
 Georgian Premier League top scorer (2): 2005/2006 (21 goals), 2011/2012 (20 goals)
 Author of first "UEFA Europa League" hat-trick.

Goals at European cups UCL&UEL

09–07–09 Zestafoni 6–0 Lisburn Distillery (3)

23–07–09 Helsingborg 2–2 Zestafoni (1)

01–07–10 Zestafoni 5–0 Faetano (2)

15–07–10 Zestafoni 3–0 Dukla (2)

13–07–11 Zestafoni 3–0 Dacia (2)

18–08–11 Zestafoni 3–3 Club Brugge (1)

24–07–12 Zestafoni 2–2 Neftçi (1)

16–07–13 Dinamo Tbilisi 6–1 EB / Streymur (1)

23–07–13 EB / Streymur 1–3 Dinamo Tbilisi (1)

Career statistics

References

External links
 Player profile at official web-site of Zestafoni
 
 
 

1985 births
Living people
Footballers from Georgia (country)
Association football defenders
Erovnuli Liga players
Azerbaijan Premier League players
Moldovan Super Liga players
FC Dinamo Tbilisi players
FC Sioni Bolnisi players
FC Chikhura Sachkhere players
FC Metalurgi Rustavi players
FC Dacia Chișinău players
FC Zestafoni players
Qarabağ FK players
Expatriate footballers in Azerbaijan
Expatriate footballers in Moldova
Georgia (country) international footballers
Expatriate sportspeople from Georgia (country) in Azerbaijan